Laskowiec may refer to the following places:
Laskowiec, Kuyavian-Pomeranian Voivodeship (north-central Poland)
Laskowiec, Łódź Voivodeship (central Poland)
Laskowiec, Podlaskie Voivodeship (north-east Poland)
Laskowiec, Masovian Voivodeship (east-central Poland)
Laskowiec, Opole Voivodeship (south-west Poland)